Football Club Zenit, also known as Zenit Saint Petersburg or simply Zenit, is a Russian professional football club based in   Saint Petersburg. Founded in 1925 (or in 1914, according to some Russian sources), the club plays in the Russian Premier League. Zenit are the reigning champions of the Russian Premier League. Previously they won the 2007, 2010, 2011–12, 2014–15, 2018–19, 2019–20 and the 2020–21 seasons of the Russian Premier League, as well as the 2007–08 UEFA Cup and the 2008 UEFA Super Cup. The club is owned and sponsored by the Russian state-owned energy giant Gazprom. The team play its home matches at the Gazprom Arena. In March 2022, the club was expelled from all European and international club competitions by FIFA and the UEFA due to the 2022 Russian invasion of Ukraine. In addition, the European Club Association suspended the team.

History

Before Zenit
Zenit's history is tightly connected with the political history of Saint Petersburg, Russia (also called "Petrograd" and "Leningrad" at times in its history). In 1897, the first officially-recorded football match in Russia was held in Saint Petersburg on Vasilievsky Island, an unofficial game between the local English team "Ostrov" and the local Russian team "Petrograd," which the English team won, 6–0. The players of those local teams were amateurs and loosely associated with each other.

Formation of Zenit
The original Zenit team stemmed from several football teams, which changed names and owners many times during the Soviet era after the Revolution of 1917, as powerful political forces manipulated the careers of individual players as well as the fate of the whole team. The club was renamed several times and its owners and leaders were under political pressure for many decades. The origins of Zenit date back to the beginning of the 20th century to several predecessor teams in Saint Petersburg that were playing locally. The oldest documented predecessor of Zenit was the team "Murzinka," founded in 1914, which played in the Obukhovsky stadium from 1914 until 1924, when the team came to be known as "Bolshevik" (the new name for Obukhovsky industry and its stadium). The team and stadium survived the drama of World War I, the Bolshevik revolution of 1917, and the Russian Civil War of 1918 to 1922.

In 1925, another predecessor team of Zenit was formed, of workers from the Leningradsky Metallichesky Zavod (Leningrad Metal Plant); they were called the "Stalinets" in the 1930s. (Stalinets translates literally to English as "Stalinist"; however, in Russian, the name is a play on words as stal means "steel" in that language.) Historians documented that both predecessor teams of Zenit were playing independently until their official merger at the end of 1939. The Stalinets were not the same team named Zenit that took part in the 1938 USSR championship. The current name of FC Zenit was registered in 1936 (as Bolshevik became part of the Zenit sports society and was renamed), three years before the Stalinets merged with it. The name Zenit means "Zenith".

In 1939, during the rule of Joseph Stalin, Leningradsky Metallichesky Zavod became part of the military industry and its sports teams, players, and managers were transferred to the Zenit sports society. FC Zenit was ordered to take in members of the "Stalinets" metallurgical workers' team after the end of the 1939 season.

Zenit in the Soviet League
Zenit won their first honours in 1944, claiming the war-time USSR Cup after defeating CSKA Moscow in the well-attended final. The club was always adored in Leningrad, but was not able to make much of a significant impact in the Soviet League. In 1967, Zenit finished last but were saved from relegation because the Soviet leadership decided it would not be prudent to relegate a Leningrad team during the 50th anniversary of the October Revolution, which occurred in the city. Composer Dmitry Shostakovich and film star Kirill Lavrov were well known as ardent supporters of Zenit, a passion that is reflected in their attendance of many games. Zenit won the bronze medal in 1980, also reaching the Soviet Cup Final and winning the Soviet League title in 1984. In 1985, Zenit beat the Soviet Cup holder in the Soviet Super Cup (also called the Season Cup).

Zenit in the Russian League
The LOMO optical plant took up the ownership of the team after the war. In 1990, FC Zenit were re-registered as an independent city-owned professional club. After being relegated in the first year of the Russian League (1992), Zenit returned to the top flight in 1996 and has been decent since. They claimed the 1999 Russian Cup, finished third in the League in 2001, made the Cup final in 2002, became the runners-up in the Premier League and won the Russian Premier League Cup in 2003.

Gazprom era
In December 2005, Gazprom took a controlling stake in the club. The deal was announced by Valentina Matviyenko, the Saint Petersburg governor. Gazprom bought the majority of the club.

Under Advocaat

Although Zenit reached the quarter-finals of the UEFA Cup in 2006, a mediocre start to the league season led to the summer replacement of coach Vlastimil Petržela. In July 2006, Dick Advocaat took over as Zenit's manager. Advocaat worked together with his assistant manager, former Netherlands national youth team coach Cor Pot. Zenit won the 2007 Russian Premier League—their best league achievement since winning the USSR Championship in 1984—allowing them to compete in the group stage of the 2008–09 UEFA Champions League.

In 2008, Zenit won the Russian Super Cup and reached the quarter-final of the UEFA Cup for the second time in their history. In the first leg of the quarter-final away game against German side Bayer Leverkusen, the team achieved a 4–1 victory. They qualified for the semi-finals of the competition for the first time in their history, despite a 1–0 home loss to Leverkusen in the second leg, and were drawn to play further German opposition in the semi-final, Bayern Munich, considered the top team remaining. A battling performance in the first leg of the semi-final earned Zenit a 1–1 draw away against Bayern Munich. In the second leg at home, Zenit won 4–0, defeating Bayern 5–1 on aggregate and going through to the UEFA Cup Final for the first time in club history, where they met Scottish side Rangers at the City of Manchester Stadium in Manchester on 14 May. Zenit won 2–0, with goals from Igor Denisov in the 72nd minute and Konstantin Zyryanov in stoppage time, to lift the club's first-ever UEFA Cup. Andrey Arshavin was named man of the match.

On 29 August 2008, at the Stade Louis II in Monaco, Zenit then defeated Manchester United 2–1 in the 2008 UEFA Super Cup, becoming the first Russian side to win the trophy. Pavel Pogrebnyak scored the first goal and Danny scored the second, the latter being named man of the match in his debut for Zenit.

In the 2008–09 Champions League group stage, Zenit was grouped with Real Madrid, Juventus and BATE Borisov in Group H, which by some was marked as the "group of death." Zenit ultimately finished in third place in the group, behind Juventus and Real Madrid, and was thus unable to progress to the knockout phase of the competition. This position, however, was good enough to earn the club a place in the 2008–09 UEFA Cup last 32, where the team faced VfB Stuttgart for a place in the last 16 of the competition. After defeating Stuttgart on away goals, Zenit went on to lose 2–1 over two legs against Italian club Udinese.

Under Spalletti

Luciano Spalletti signed a contract with Zenit in December 2009, with Italian coaches Daniele Baldini, Marco Domenichini and Alberto Bartali also joining the Russian club. The Board of Zenit mandated him to return the Russian Premier League title to Zenit, win the Russian Cup and progress from the group stage of the Champions League in his first year.

Zenit won the Russian Cup on 16 May 2010 after beating Sibir Novosibirsk in the final (previously beating Volga Tver in the quarter-finals and Amkar Perm in the semi-finals). After 16 games in the 2010 Premier League, with 12 wins and four draws, Zenit claimed 40 points, setting a new Russian Premier League record for most points won at that stage of the campaign.

On 25 August 2010, Zenit lost its first game under Spalletti to French side Auxerre and failed to advance to the Champions League group stage, instead participating in the Europa League. On 3 October, Zenit beat Spartak Nalchik to set another Russian Premier League record for most consecutive games going undefeated, with 21 games since the start of the league season. On 27 October, however, Zenit suffered its first defeat of the season at the hands of rival club Spartak Moscow, just seven games short of finishing the championship undefeated. On 14 November, Zenit defeated Rostov and two games prior to the end of the season won the championship title, the first in Spalletti's managerial career.

Zenit progressed through the knockout stage of the 2010–11 Europa League in first place, then beating Swiss side Young Boys in the Round of 16. On 6 March 2011, Zenit won against CSKA Moscow in the Russian Super Cup, the third Russian trophy won under Spalletti. On 17 March, however, Zenit were knocked out of the Europa League, losing to Dutch team Twente 2–3 on aggregate in the quarter-finals.

In the 2011–12 Champions League, Zenit began the group stage drawn into Group G alongside Porto, Shakhtar Donetsk and APOEL. On 6 December 2011, the team finished the group stage in second place and for the first time in club's history qualified for the spring knockout phase of Champions League. In the Round of 16, Zenit were drawn with Portuguese side Benfica, winning the first leg 3–2 at home through two goals from Roman Shirokov and one from Sergei Semak. In the second leg in Lisbon, however, Zenit lost 2–0 and were thus eliminated from the competition.

In April 2012, Zenit won their second-straight Russian Championship after beating Dynamo Moscow.

Under Villas-Boas
After a series of disappointing results in both the Champions League and the Premier League, Spalletti was fired on 11 March 2014. A week later, the club announced they had negotiated a two-year deal with André Villas-Boas, who himself had been released a few months prior after a disappointing stint as manager of English side Tottenham Hotspur. In the 2014–15 Europa League, Zenit were eliminated in the quarter-finals by eventual champions Sevilla. In May 2015, Zenit won the Russian Championship, the first championship title under Villas-Boas and the team's fifth-ever on the eve of its 90th anniversary celebration. Zenit then defeated Lokomotiv Moscow in the 2015 Russian Super Cup 1–1 (4–2 on penalties).

Later in the 2015 calendar year, Villas-Boas said that he would be leaving the club after the 2015–16 season. In the 2015–16 Champions League, Zenit began the competition in the group stage. They were drawn in Group H alongside Valencia, Lyon and Gent. They ended the group stage with their best group stage finish ever, winning five out of six matches and emerging as group winners.  They were, however, eliminated from the competition in the Round of 16 by Portuguese side Benfica.

On 24 May 2016 Villas-Boas left the club at the end of the season, with Mircea Lucescu appointed the new manager of Zenit.

Under Lucescu and Mancini
In July 2016 Zenit won the Russian Super Cup after a 0–1 victory over CSKA Moscow.

During the 2016–17 Europa League, Zenit began the group stage drawn into Group D alongside Maccabi Tel Aviv, AZ Alkmaar and Dundalk. On 8 December 2016, the team finished the group stage in first place and qualified for the spring knockout phase of Europa League. In the round of 32, Zenit faced R.S.C. Anderlecht and was eliminated 3–3 on aggregate due to the away goals rule. In the league, Zenit's performances in the spring were disappointing and as such the club finished third and missed out on the Champions League for the second year in a row. Zenit was also eliminated in the round of 16 by FC Anzhi Makhachkala 0–4 on aggregate after an abysmal performance. The first (and last) season of Mircea Lucescu was a complete disappointment despite the expectations.

On 1 June 2017 Zenit appointed Roberto Mancini as the new manager of the team. On 13 May 2018, Mancini terminated his contract by mutual consent.

Under Semak

In May 2018, Mancini left to become the head coach of the Italy national football team. Sergey Semak became the new manager of Zenit, receiving a two-year contract.

In August 2018, during the 1st leg of the 3rd qualification round of the UEFA Europa League, Zenit suffered a 0–4 loss to Dynamo Minsk. During the 2nd leg back on home ground, Zenit made a comeback winning 8–1, scoring 3 goals in the second half and 4 goals in the second half of the extra time, with 2 goals scored in the 120th minute. Zenit went on to beat Molde FK 4–3 on aggregate in the next round, entering the group stage of 2018-19 UEFA Europa League.

In March 2020, the league was forced to halt due to the COVID-19 pandemic in Russia. Zenit secured another title on 5 July 2020 after a victory over FC Krasnodar, with 4 games left to play in the tournament.

On 2 May 2021, Zenit secured their third title in a row in a 6–1 victory over second-place FC Lokomotiv Moscow. Zenit opened the 2021–22 season with a seventh win in the Russian Super Cup after a 3–0 win over Lokomotiv Moscow, but without major key players who left the club like Yuri Zhirkov, Andrei Lunev, and Sebastián Driussi.

After the 2022 Russian invasion of Ukraine, former Ukrainian international Yaroslav Rakitskiy made a pro-Ukrainian post on Instagram and severed his contract with the team. FIFA and the UEFA indefinitely suspended the team from their competitions. In addition, the European Club Association suspended the team.

On 30 April 2022, Zenit secured their fourth title in a row and eighth overall. Many of Zenit's foreign players have not been able to leave Russia, unable to secure moves away from Russian clubs, due to western sanctions placed upon the country as a result of Russia's war with Ukraine.

Stadiums

Zenit's home ground is now the 67,800-capacity Krestovsky Stadium, known as Gazprom Arena for sponsorship reasons, in Saint Petersburg. Petrovsky Stadium used to be the home ground of the team before the new Krestovsky Stadium was built. Before moving to the Petrovsky Stadium, Zenit's home ground was the Kirov Stadium. It stood on the site where the Krestovsky Stadium was later erected.

Honours

Domestic competitions
Soviet Top League / Russian Premier League
Champions (9): 1984, 2007, 2010, 2011–12, 2014–15, 2018–19, 2019–20, 2020–21, 2021–22

Soviet Cup / Russian Cup
Winners (5): 1944, 1998–99, 2009–10, 2015–16,  2019–20
Runners-up: 1939, 1984, 2001–02

Soviet Super Cup / Russian Super Cup
Winners (8): 1984, 2008, 2011, 2015, 2016, 2020, 2021, 2022
Runners-up: 2012, 2013, 2019

USSR Federation Cup / Russian Premier League Cup
Winners: 2003 
Runners-up: 1986

Soviet First League / Russian National Football League
Runners-up: 1993 (Center)

The Atlantic Cup
Winners (2): 2016, 2022

International competitions
UEFA Cup
Winners: 2007–08

UEFA Super Cup
Winners: 2008

League and cup history

Soviet Union
{|class="wikitable"
|- style="background:#efefef;"
! Season
! Div.
! Pos.
! Pl.
! W
! D
! L
! GS
! GA
! P
!Domestic Cup
!colspan=2|Europe
|-
|align=center|1936
|align=center|2nd
|align=center|3
|align=center|6
|align=center|
|align=center|
|align=center|
|align=center|9
|align=center|9
|align=center|13
|align=center|
|align=center|
|align=center|
|-
|align=center|1936
|align=center|2nd
|align=center|6
|align=center|7
|align=center|
|align=center|
|align=center|
|align=center|6
|align=center|13
|align=center|12
|align=center|Round of 16
|align=center|
|align=center|
|-
|align=center|1937
|align=center|2nd
|align=center|4
|align=center|12
|align=center|
|align=center|
|align=center|
|align=center|22
|align=center|18
|align=center|25
|align=center|Round of 128
|align=center|
|align=center|
|-
|align=center|1938
|align=center|1st
|align=center|14
|align=center|25
|align=center|7
|align=center|10
|align=center|8
|align=center|38
|align=center|57
|align=center|24
|align=center|Round of 16
|align=center|
|align=center|
|-
|align=center|1939
|align=center|1st
|align=center|11
|align=center|26
|align=center|7
|align=center|7
|align=center|12
|align=center|30
|align=center|46
|align=center|21
|  style="text-align:center; background:silver;"|Runner-up
|align=center|
|align=center|
|-
|align=center|1940
|align=center|1st
|align=center|10
|align=center|24
|align=center|6
|align=center|6
|align=center|12
|align=center|37
|align=center|42
|align=center|18
|align=center|
|align=center|
|align=center|
|-
|align=center|1944
|align=center|
|align=center|
|align=center|
|align=center|
|align=center|
|align=center|
|align=center|
|align=center|
|align=center|
|  style="text-align:center; background:gold;"|Winner
|align=center|
|align=center|
|-
|align=center|1945
|align=center|1st
|align=center|6
|align=center|
|align=center|8
|align=center|7
|align=center|7
|align=center|35
|align=center|31
|align=center|23
|  style="text-align:center; background:#deb678;"|Semi-final
|align=center|
|align=center|
|-
|align=center|1946
|align=center|1st
|align=center|9
|align=center|22
|align=center|5
|align=center|5
|align=center|12
|align=center|22
|align=center|45
|align=center|15
|align=center|Round of 16
|align=center|
|align=center|
|-
|align=center|1947
|align=center|1st
|align=center|6
|align=center|24
|align=center|10
|align=center|2
|align=center|12
|align=center|35
|align=center|49
|align=center|22
|align=center|Quarter-final
|align=center|
|align=center|
|-
|align=center|1948
|align=center|1st
|align=center|13
|align=center|26
|align=center|4
|align=center|9
|align=center|13
|align=center|29
|align=center|48
|align=center|17
|align=center|Round of 16
|align=center|
|align=center|
|-
|align=center|1949
|align=center|1st
|align=center|5
|align=center|34
|align=center|17
|align=center|8
|align=center|9
|align=center|48
|align=center|48
|align=center|42
|align=center|Quarter-final
|align=center|
|align=center|
|-
|align=center|1950
|align=center|1st
|align=center|6
|align=center|36
|align=center|19
|align=center|5
|align=center|12
|align=center|70
|align=center|59
|align=center|43
|align=center|Quarter-final
|align=center|
|align=center|
|-
|align=center|1951
|align=center|1st
|align=center|7
|align=center|28
|align=center|10
|align=center|8
|align=center|10
|align=center|36
|align=center|40
|align=center|28
|align=center|Round of 16
|align=center|
|align=center|
|-
|align=center|1952
|align=center|1st
|align=center|7
|align=center|13
|align=center|6
|align=center|2
|align=center|5
|align=center|20
|align=center|21
|align=center|14
|align=center|Quarter-final
|align=center|
|align=center|
|-
|align=center|1953
|align=center|1st
|align=center|5
|align=center|20
|align=center|11
|align=center|1
|align=center|8
|align=center|25
|align=center|21
|align=center|23
|align=center|Round of 16
|align=center|
|align=center|
|-
|align=center|1954
|align=center|1st
|align=center|7
|align=center|24
|align=center|8
|align=center|7
|align=center|9
|align=center|27
|align=center|26
|align=center|23
|  style="text-align:center; background:#deb678;"|Semi-final
|align=center|
|align=center|
|-
|align=center|1955
|align=center|1st
|align=center|8
|align=center|22
|align=center|5
|align=center|8
|align=center|9
|align=center|23
|align=center|36
|align=center|18
|align=center|Round of 16
|align=center|
|align=center|
|-
|align=center|1956
|align=center|1st
|align=center|9
|align=center|22
|align=center|4
|align=center|11
|align=center|7
|align=center|27
|align=center|43
|align=center|19
|align=center|
|align=center|
|align=center|
|-
|align=center|1957
|align=center|1st
|align=center|10
|align=center|22
|align=center|4
|align=center|7
|align=center|11
|align=center|23
|align=center|41
|align=center|15
|align=center|Round of 16
|align=center|
|align=center|
|-
|align=center|1958
|align=center|1st
|align=center|4
|align=center|22
|align=center|9
|align=center|8
|align=center|5
|align=center|41
|align=center|32
|align=center|26
|align=center|Round of 16
|align=center|
|align=center|
|-
|align=center|1959
|align=center|1st
|align=center|8
|align=center|22
|align=center|8
|align=center|4
|align=center|10
|align=center|29
|align=center|38
|align=center|20
|align=center|
|align=center|
|align=center|
|-
|align=center|1960
|align=center|1st
|align=center|15
|align=center|30
|align=center|14
|align=center|5
|align=center|11
|align=center|47
|align=center|37
|align=center|33
|align=center|Round of 32
|align=center|
|align=center|
|-
|align=center|1961
|align=center|1st
|align=center|13
|align=center|32
|align=center|12
|align=center|8
|align=center|12
|align=center|50
|align=center|52
|align=center|32
|  style="text-align:center; background:#deb678;"|Semi-final
|align=center|
|align=center|
|-
|align=center|1962
|align=center|1st
|align=center|11
|align=center|32
|align=center|11
|align=center|7
|align=center|14
|align=center|53
|align=center|42
|align=center|29
|align=center|Round of 32
|align=center|
|align=center|
|-
|align=center|1963
|align=center|1st
|align=center|6
|align=center|38
|align=center|14
|align=center|17
|align=center|7
|align=center|45
|align=center|32
|align=center|45
|align=center|Round of 32
|align=center|
|align=center|
|-
|align=center|1964
|align=center|1st
|align=center|11
|align=center|32
|align=center|9
|align=center|9
|align=center|14
|align=center|30
|align=center|35
|align=center|27
|align=center|Round of 16
|align=center|
|align=center|
|-
|align=center|1965
|align=center|1st
|align=center|9
|align=center|32
|align=center|10
|align=center|12
|align=center|10
|align=center|32
|align=center|32
|align=center|32
|align=center|Round of 32
|align=center|
|align=center|
|-
|align=center|1966
|align=center|1st
|align=center|16
|align=center|36
|align=center|10
|align=center|8
|align=center|18
|align=center|35
|align=center|54
|align=center|28
|align=center|Round of 16
|align=center|
|align=center|
|-
|align=center|1967
|align=center|1st
|align=center|19
|align=center|36
|align=center|6
|align=center|9
|align=center|21
|align=center|28
|align=center|63
|align=center|21
|align=center|Round of 32
|align=center|
|align=center|
|-
|align=center|1968
|align=center|1st
|align=center|11
|align=center|38
|align=center|10
|align=center|14
|align=center|14
|align=center|35
|align=center|49
|align=center|34
|align=center|Round of 32
|align=center|
|align=center|
|-
|align=center|1969
|align=center|1st
|align=center|9
|align=center|26
|align=center|6
|align=center|9
|align=center|11
|align=center|21
|align=center|34
|align=center|21
|align=center|Round of 16
|align=center|
|align=center|
|-
|align=center|1970
|align=center|1st
|align=center|14
|align=center|32
|align=center|10
|align=center|7
|align=center|15
|align=center|30
|align=center|40
|align=center|27
|align=center|Quarter-final
|align=center|
|align=center|
|-
|align=center|1971
|align=center|1st
|align=center|13
|align=center|30
|align=center|8
|align=center|10
|align=center|12
|align=center|29
|align=center|32
|align=center|26
|align=center|Quarter-final
|align=center|
|align=center|
|-
|align=center|1972
|align=center|1st
|align=center|7
|align=center|30
|align=center|11
|align=center|11
|align=center|8
|align=center|44
|align=center|30
|align=center|33
|align=center|Quarter-final
|align=center|
|align=center|
|-
|align=center|1973
|align=center|1st
|align=center|11
|align=center|30
|align=center|9
|align=center|12
|align=center|9
|align=center|33
|align=center|35
|align=center|21
|align=center|Round of 16
|align=center|
|align=center|
|-
|align=center|1974
|align=center|1st
|align=center|7
|align=center|30
|align=center|8
|align=center|15
|align=center|7
|align=center|36
|align=center|41
|align=center|31
|align=center|Round of 16
|align=center|
|align=center|
|-
|align=center|1975
|align=center|1st
|align=center|14
|align=center|30
|align=center|7
|align=center|10
|align=center|13
|align=center|27
|align=center|42
|align=center|24
|align=center|Round of 16
|align=center|
|align=center|
|-
|align=center|1976
|align=center|1st
|align=center|13
|align=center|15
|align=center|4
|align=center|5
|align=center|6
|align=center|14
|align=center|15
|align=center|13
|align=center|
|align=center|
|align=center|
|-
|align=center|1976
|align=center|1st
|align=center|5
|align=center|15
|align=center|6
|align=center|4
|align=center|5
|align=center|22
|align=center|16
|align=center|16
|align=center|Round of 16
|align=center|
|align=center|
|-
|align=center|1977
|align=center|1st
|align=center|10
|align=center|30
|align=center|8
|align=center|12
|align=center|10
|align=center|34
|align=center|33
|align=center|28
|  style="text-align:center; background:#deb678;"|Semi-final
|align=center|
|align=center|
|-
|align=center|1978
|align=center|1st
|align=center|10
|align=center|30
|align=center|9
|align=center|8
|align=center|13
|align=center|31
|align=center|46
|align=center|26
|align=center|Quarter-final
|align=center|
|align=center|
|-
|align=center|1979
|align=center|1st
|align=center|10
|align=center|34
|align=center|11
|align=center|9
|align=center|14
|align=center|41
|align=center|45
|align=center|30
|align=center|Group stage
|align=center|
|align=center|
|-
|align=center|1980
|align=center|1st
|  style="text-align:center; background:#deb678;"|3
|align=center|34
|align=center|16
|align=center|10
|align=center|8
|align=center|51
|align=center|42
|align=center|42
|align=center|Group stage
|align=center|
|align=center|
|-
|align=center|1981
|align=center|1st
|align=center|15
|align=center|34
|align=center|9
|align=center|10
|align=center|15
|align=center|33
|align=center|43
|align=center|28
|align=center|Round of 16
|align=center|
|align=center|
|-
|align=center|1982
|align=center|1st
|align=center|7
|align=center|34
|align=center|12
|align=center|9
|align=center|13
|align=center|44
|align=center|41
|align=center|33
|align=center|Group stage
|align=center|UC
|align=center|First round
|-
|align=center|1983
|align=center|1st
|align=center|4
|align=center|34
|align=center|15
|align=center|11
|align=center|8
|align=center|42
|align=center|32
|align=center|40
|  style="text-align:center; background:#deb678;"|Semi-final
|align=center|
|align=center|
|-
|align=center|1984
|align=center|1st
|  style="text-align:center; background:gold;"|1
|align=center|34
|align=center|19
|align=center|9
|align=center|6
|align=center|60
|align=center|32
|align=center|47
|  style="text-align:center; background:silver;"|Runner-up
|align=center|
|align=center|
|-
|align=center|1985
|align=center|1st
|align=center|6
|align=center|34
|align=center|14
|align=center|7
|align=center|13
|align=center|48
|align=center|38
|align=center|35
|  style="text-align:center; background:#deb678;"|Semi-final
|align=center|
|align=center|
|-
|align=center|1986
|align=center|1st
|align=center|4
|align=center|30
|align=center|12
|align=center|9
|align=center|9
|align=center|44
|align=center|36
|align=center|33
|  style="text-align:center; background:#deb678;"|Semi-final
|align=center|ECC
|align=center|Second round
|-
|align=center|1987
|align=center|1st
|align=center|14
|align=center|30
|align=center|7
|align=center|10
|align=center|13
|align=center|25
|align=center|37
|align=center|24
|align=center|Round of 16
|align=center|
|align=center|
|-
|align=center|1988
|align=center|1st
|align=center|6
|align=center|30
|align=center|11
|align=center|9
|align=center|10
|align=center|35
|align=center|34
|align=center|31
|align=center|Round of 16
|align=center|UC
|align=center|First round
|-
|align=center|1989
|align=center|1st
|  style="text-align:center; background:#f65f45;"|16
|align=center|30
|align=center|5
|align=center|9
|align=center|16
|align=center|24
|align=center|48
|align=center|19
|align=center|Round of 16
|align=center|
|align=center|
|-
|align=center|1990
|align=center|2nd
|align=center|18
|align=center|38
|align=center|8
|align=center|14
|align=center|16
|align=center|35
|align=center|41
|align=center|30
|align=center|Round of 32
|align=center|UC
|align=center|Second round
|-
|align=center|1991
|align=center|2nd
|align=center|18
|align=center|42
|align=center|11
|align=center|14
|align=center|17
|align=center|44
|align=center|50
|align=center|36
|align=center|Round of 32
|align=center|
|align=center|
|}

Russia

League positions

Players

Current squad

Out on loan

Reserve squad

Zenit's reserve squad played professionally as Zenit-2 (Russian Second League in 1993, Russian Second Division from 1998 to 2000) and Zenit-d (Russian Third League from 1994 to 1997). Another team that was founded as Lokomotiv-Zenit-2 played as Zenit-2 in the Russian Second Division from 2001 to 2008. By 2008, there was no relation between that team and FC Zenit. Another farm club called FC Smena-Zenit debuted in the Russian Second Division in 2009, taking the spot of the former FC Zenit-2. FC Smena-Zenit was dissolved after the 2009 season because it did not fulfill Zenit's initial expectations. Zenit-2 reentered professional football in the 2013–14 season in the Russian Professional Football League.

Team captains

Club officials

Board of directors
{| class="wikitable"
|-
! style="color:#fff; background:#348eb9;"|Position
! style="color:#fff; background:#348eb9;"|Name
|-
|General Director
|Alexander Medvedev
|-
|Sporting Director
|Vacant
|-
|Deputy General Directors
|Dmitri Mankin
|-
|Deputy General Directors
|Vyacheslav Malafeev 
|-
|Deputy General Directors
|Rosteslav Leontyev
|-
|Deputy General Directors
|Zhanna Dembo
|-
|Deputy General Directors
|Yury Andreyevich
|-
|Director of the "Smena" study-practice complex
|Vasily Kostrovsky
|-

Management
{| class="wikitable"
|-
! style="color:#fff; background:#348eb9;"|Position
! style="color:#fff; background:#348eb9;"|Name
|-
|Manager
| Sergey Semak
|-
|Assistant managers
| Aleksandr Nizelik   William Artur de Oliveira   Igor Simutenkov    Anatoliy Tymoshchuk   Aleksandr Anyukov   
|-
|Goalkeeping coach
| Mikhail Biryukov   Yuri Zhevnov
|-
|Fitness coach
| Ivan Carminati   Andrea Scanavino   Mariya Burova
|-
|Doctor
| Mikhail Grishin

Ownerships, sponsors, kit suppliers

Partnership

Other football clubs
 Schalke 04
 Shakhtar Donetsk
 Red Star Belgrade
 Sepahan

Corporations
MegaFon
Rossiya Airlines
Nissan
Obi (store)
Rostelecom
Corinthia Saint Petersburg
St. Peter Line
Google

Presidents

Head coaches

Zenit in European football

As of 8 December 2021

By competition

Notable players 
Had international caps for their respective countries. Players whose name is listed in bold represented their countries while playing for Zenit.

USSR/Russia
  Mikhail Biryukov
  Vasily Danilov
  Sergey Dmitriyev
  Vladimir Golubev
  Aleksandr Ivanov
  Leonid Ivanov
  Anzor Kavazashvili
  Vladimir Kazachyonok
  Nikolay Larionov
  Fridrikh Maryutin
   Dmitri Radchenko
  Sergei Salnikov
  Sergei Shvetsov
  Yuriy Voynov
  Anatoli Zinchenko
    Vasili Kulkov
   Valeri Broshin
  Aleksandr Anyukov
  Andrey Arshavin
  Zelimkhan Bakayev
  Aleksandr Bukharov
  Vladimir Bystrov
  Dmitri Chistyakov
  Maksim Demenko
  Igor Denisov
  Artyom Dzyuba
  Viktor Fayzulin
   Alexandr Gorshkov
  Aleksei Igonin
  Aleksei Ionov
  Maksim Kanunnikov
  Vyacheslav Karavayev
  Aleksandr Kerzhakov
  Andrey Kobelev
  Aleksandr Kokorin
  Sergei Kolotovkin
  Andrei Kondrashov
  Stanislav Kritsyuk
  Danil Krugovoy
  Daler Kuzyayev
  Vladimir Lebed
  Yury Lodygin
  Andrey Lunyov
  Ilya Maksimov
  Vyacheslav Malafeev
  Pavel Mogilevets
  Andrei Mostovoy
  Elmir Nabiullin
  Ivan Novoseltsev
  Magomed Ozdoyev
  Aleksandr Panov
  Sergei Petrov
  Sergei Podpaly
  Pavel Pogrebnyak
  Dmitry Poloz

  Vladislav Radimov
  Aleksandr Ryazantsev
  Sergey Semak
  Igor Semshov
  Oleg Shatov
  Roman Shirokov
  Igor Smolnikov
  Aleksei Sutormin
  Renat Yanbayev
  Aleksandr Yerokhin
  Artur Yusupov
  Anton Zabolotny
  Yuri Zhirkov
  Denis Zubko
  Konstantin Zyryanov
Former Soviet Union countries
  Roman Berezovsky
  Sargis Hovsepyan
  Yervand Krbachyan
  Artem Simonyan
  Ramil Sheydayev
  Dmitry Ogorodnik
  Boris Gorovoy
  Sergey Gerasimets
  Kirill Kaplenko
  Sergey Kornilenko
  Yuri Zhevnov
  Solomon Kvirkvelia
  Saba Sazonov
  Nuraly Alip
  Andrei Kurdyumov
  Peter Neustädter
  Yevgeni Tarasov
  Egidijus Majus
  Darius Miceika
  Robertas Poškus
  Irmantas Stumbrys
  Ovidijus Verbickas
  Serghei Cleșcenco
  Alexandru Curteian
  Andrei Manannikov
  Vazgen Manasyan
  Dmitri Khomukha
  Dmitri Nezhelev
  Vladimir Gorily
  Roman Maksimyuk
  Sergey Popov
  Yaroslav Rakitskiy
   Oleg Salenko
  Aleksandr Spivak
  Aleksandr Svistunov
  Anatoliy Tymoschuk
  Igor Zhabchenko
Europe
  Nicolas Lombaerts

  Axel Witsel
  Darko Maletić
  Ivica Križanac
  Dejan Lovren
  Marek Kincl
  Pavel Mareš
  Radek Šírl
  Michael Lumb
  Boris Rotenberg
  Szabolcs Huszti
  Domenico Criscito
  Claudio Marchisio
  Alessandro Rosina
  Mikhail Zaritskiy
  Dragan Čadikovski
  Veliče Šumulikoski
  Luka Đorđević
  Erik Hagen
  Bruno Alves
  Danny
  Fernando Meira
  Luís Neto
  Zeno Bundea
  Milan Rodić
  Branislav Ivanović
  Mateja Kežman
  Danko Lazović
  Aleksandar Luković
  Kamil Čontofalský
  Tomáš Hubočan
  Róbert Mak
  Martin Škrtel
  Miha Mevlja
  Javi García
  Fatih Tekke
South and Central America
  Cristian Ansaldi
  Ezequiel Garay
  Matías Kranevitter
  Emanuel Mammana
  Leandro Paredes
  Emiliano Rigoni
  Giuliano
  Hulk
  Douglas Santos
  Wílmar Barrios
  Christian Noboa
  Yordan Osorio
  Salomón Rondón
Asia
  Sardar Azmoun
  Kim Dong-jin
  Lee Ho
  Hyun Young-min

Rivalries
Zenit's traditional rivals are the big Moscow clubs, most notably FC Spartak Moscow, CSKA Moscow, FC Dynamo Moscow and FC Torpedo Moscow. They also shared rivalries with the big Ukrainian clubs FC Dynamo Kyiv and FC Shakhtar Donetsk in the Soviet era.

See also

ZFK Zenit Saint Petersburg

Notes

References

External links

  

 
Association football clubs established in 1925
Football clubs in Saint Petersburg
1925 establishments in Russia
FC
Soviet Top League clubs
Works association football clubs in Russia
UEFA Cup winning clubs
UEFA Super Cup winning clubs